Kabuku is a settlement in Kenya's Central Province.

It is also the home of St. Paul's University's Main campus, which is a private university in Kenya. It is also home of Karura Community Chapel, Kabuku Campus

References 

Populated places in Central Province (Kenya)